Joe Gruters (born June 7, 1977) was the Chairman of the Florida Republican Party from 2018-2022, and is a member of the Florida Senate representing the 23rd District, which consists of Sarasota County and part of Charlotte County. He was previously a member of the Florida House of Representatives. Earlier in his career, Gruters worked on the campaign of U.S. Rep. Vern Buchanan as campaign manager and was vice chairman of the Republican Party of Florida and chairman of the Republican Party of Sarasota.

Political career

Campaign activities and rise to influence
Gruters lost his first two elections and worked behind the scenes on several more losing campaigns. He joined Vern Buchanan’s original successful 2006 campaign for Congress. Gruters subsequently was chairman of the Republican Party of Sarasota for ten years, longer than any of his predecessors.

Gruters gained political influence as an early supporter of Rick Scott during his successful 2010 campaign for governor of Florida. Gruters' support earned him a high-profile appointment to the Florida State University Board of Trustees. He became vice chairman of the Republican Party of Florida in 2015, and had strong political backers when he ran for the Florida House of Representatives' seat in 2016.

Trump supporter and Republican Party of Florida chairman
Gruters is one of Donald Trump's closest political allies in Florida. An early Trump supporter, Gruters was Florida co-chairman of Trump's 2016 campaign. Gruters forged a relationship with Donald Trump in 2012 after Republican leaders snubbed the New York celebrity at the Republican National Convention in Tampa, Florida. Trump accepted an invitation from Gruters to invite him to speak in Sarasota the night before the convention.

Gruters was elected to a two-year term as chairman of the Republican Party of Florida on January 11, 2019 at the party's annual meeting in Orlando, winning a  two-year term. He defeated Bob Starr of Charlotte County and succeeded state Representative Blaise Ingoglia. Gruters passed out red "Keep Florida Great" hats ahead of the vote and declared that his "singular focus over the next two years" was winning reelection for Trump. Gruters's easy election coincides with more internal unity among the Florida Republican Party, which had been divided after a Jim Greer scandal and had suffered internal fractures during the Governor Rick Scott's terms, when Scott withdrew financial and organization support for the party after Ingoglia had defeated Scott's preferred candidate. President Trump appointed Gruters to the Amtrak board of directors, subject to confirmation by the United States Senate. The confirmation was neither confirmed nor rejected and sent back to the President.

Florida Republican voter registration surge 
During Gruters' chairmanship of the Republican Party of Florida, he made voter registration a priority. With funding help from Governor Ron DeSantis, the number of registered Republican voters surged in Florida.  According to the Florida Division of Elections, Florida voter registration numbers are now at about 5.3 million registered Republicans compared to 4.9 million Democrats — translating into a GOP lead of more than 400,000 registered voters. Data further shows Republicans’ registration advantage is growing by roughly 30,000 voters every month. 

This voter registration advantage and a get-out-the-vote campaign resulted in record wins for Republicans in the 2022 midterm elections, including DeSantis at the top of the ticket winning 62 of Florida's 67 counties (which included the normally Democratic Miami-Dade and Palm Beach counties.) The election also saw Republicans winning a supermajority in both the Florida House and Senate.

Florida Legislature 
In 2016, Gruters won election to the Florida House of Representatives from the 73rd District, which includes Eastern Manatee County and Northeastern Sarasota County, from 2016. In 2018, he won election to the Florida Senate representing the 23rd District, consisting of Sarasota County and part of Charlotte County. Gruters was endorsed in 2018 by the Florida Chamber of Commerce.  In 2022 he won re-election to the Florida Senate.

Gruters introduced three environmental bills in December 2018, ahead of the legislative session to address red tide and other issues: one bill would restore septic inspection regulations that had been lifted during the Great Recession and another would fine polluters for sewage spills.

In the wake of a fatal shooting at a California synagogue in 2019, the Florida Senate unanimously passed a bill by Gruters to combat anti-Semitism, including by requiring schools to deal with anti-Semitic behavior the same way they do racial discrimination.

Gruters was a driving force behind Florida's 2019 law (S.B. 198) that forces local and state law enforcement to honor U.S. Immigration and Customs Enforcement detainers and prohibits local government from implementing "sanctuary" policies (which no Florida government had adopted). The controversial bill passed the Florida Senate 22-18, and was signed into law by Florida's Republican governor, Ron DeSantis.

Gruters sponsored Senate Bill 796, requiring electric utilities to adopt long-term plans for burying electric lines as a protective measure against hurricanes; the Senate voted 39-1 in favor of the bill.

Gruters filed a bill to ban abortions 20 weeks after fertilization.

Gruters sponsored Senate Bill 230, a piece of legislation that would reinstate Florida's controversial quest to identify purported noncitizen voters. The legislation would require the supervisor of elections in each Florida county to enter into a local agreement with court officials to obtain a list of jurors who have self-identified as non-citizens. That list would then be compared to the registered voter rolls and the non-citizen names would be purged. Prior efforts to purge the voters in Florida have been botched, with lists of purported "noncitizens" containing some U.S. citizens. The president of the League of Women Voters of Florida called Gruters' piece of legislation "most likely a politically motivated proposal."

While in the House, Gruters co-sponsored the Florida Competitive Workforce Act to amend the 1992 Florida Civil Rights Act, the state's anti-discrimination law, to include protections against discrimination on the basis of sexual orientation and gender identity. In 2019, he introduced the Florida Inclusive Workforce Act to ban employment discrimination against LGBT people. This was a scaled-back version of the legislation; unlike the bill Gruters had previously supported, it would not extend the anti-discrimination provisions in housing and public accommodations. The omissions were opposed by the LGBT rights group Equality Florida; Gruters defended the bill's incrementalist approach, saying it would maximize the chances of passage.

Gruters is also proposing legislation that would ban smoking at public beaches statewide. Violators would be fined up to $25 or given up to 10 hours of public service.

After Joe Biden won the 2020 election and Donald Trump refused to concede while making false claims of fraud, Gruters pushed for legislation in the Florida legislature that would restrict voting rights in the state. In 2021, Gruters called for cancelling all existing mail-in ballot requests, saying they would "devastating" for Republicans up for re-election in 2022.

Personal life 
Gruters is a Certified Public Accountant.

Gruters lives in Sarasota County, is married to Sydney Gruters and they have three children.

References

|-

|-

1977 births
2020 United States presidential electors
21st-century American politicians
Florida State University alumni
Living people
People from Sarasota, Florida
Republican Party members of the Florida House of Representatives
State political party chairs of Florida
University of South Florida alumni